Bradford Exchange railway station served the city of Bradford, West Riding of Yorkshire, England, from 1850 to 1973, before being replaced by a smaller, new-build station, which was later called Bradford Interchange. Railway lines from Halifax, Queensbury, Wakefield and Leeds met south of the city centre with services terminating in the station. In the British Rail era, many services did not terminate at Exchange station but became through services which reversed in the station to carry on their journey. Exchange station was originally opened in 1850 by the Lancashire & Yorkshire Railway (L&YR) as Drake Street, becoming Exchange in April 1867 with the arrival of services from the Great Northern Railway (GNR).

It was enlarged in 1888 and closed in 1973, with the station moving to a new 4-platform site a little further south.

History
Bradford Drake Street railway station (later called Exchange) was opened by the Lancashire & Yorkshire Railway on 9 May 1850. One of the local newspapers, the Bradford Observer, described the station as being "..somewhat low and has a deficiency of glass".

Adolphus Street was deemed to be too far out of the city centre, and passengers were using the Midland station (Market Street, later ) instead. This was known to be challenging for steam trains leaving Exchange in the Leeds direction.

The initial improvements at Drake Street to accommodate the LB&HJR/GNR services amounted to just one more additional island platform, giving four lines available for services. This was deemed to not be enough space to accommodate all existing services, even when the works were ongoing and improvements could have been implemented. 125 services made use of Drake Street/Exchange on a daily basis, being split with about 60 GNR services, and the others operated by the L&YR in the form of timetabled, goods, and market days traffic. The cost was given as £8,000, which some have stated was quite a small sum for effectively doubling in size, especially as to how the later 1888 expansion scheme, cost £300,000.

On 16 January 1871, a train descending from Low Moor through Bowling Tunnel, arrived at Exchange station going too fast, with one witness stating that he could see sparks coming from the brake blocks on the engine wheels. The engine ploughed into the station platform end (no. 4 lines) and mounted up the buffer blocks crushing a man between the engine and the back wall of the station. He died soon afterward, whilst the fireman was fatally injured when he jumped from the train and had his ribs punctured by a "switch handle". He died a week later.

The 1888 expansion saw the station furnished with 10 platforms, and an overall glass roof in two sections, each spanning  in width designed by William Hunt, an L&YR engineer. The centre island platform was wider to accommodate the girders supported the glass roof.

The new station was operated as two halves, with platforms 1 – 5 belonging to the L&YR at the western end, and platforms 6 – 10 operated by the GNR at the eastern end. Both sides of the station had their own turntable and sidings, with the GNR side having a small goods area and warehouse. This was known as Vicar Lane, with the entire GNR section being built on the former L&YR goods area. The L&YR operated their own larger 5-road large warehouse on the other side of Bridge Street, which opened in 1884 before the 1888 renovations, and retained ownership of the station completely. The access and exit lines from the station mirrored the platform layouts, with two tracks at the west used by the L & Y, with two tracks at the eastern side used by the GNR. Crossovers between the lines was effected at Mill Lane Junction, which is still the dividing point to this day for the lines towards Leeds and Halifax.

The driver and another railway employee were killed, with a further 16 people being injured, and 12 of those needing hospitalisation.

The loss of rail traffic throughout the 20th century and the run-down of longer-distance services, led to a downturn in traffic at Exchange. In 1967, inspections of the bridge immediately to the south of the station (originally known as Wakefield Road, then later as Bridge Street), revealed some severe corrosion which would take some time to repair. Maintenance issues were also cited for the station, and so a proposed new £7  million interchange station, combining bus and rail, was announced in 1969. In 1972, the five lines leading to the L&YR portion of the station were disconnected to allow for the new station to be built on their formation, and allowing the former GNR lines to be kept open for residual traffic until the new station could be opened.

The former Exchange railway buildings were demolished in 1976, though a retaining wall on the north side is still in situ. The site was later used as a car park, before Bradford Law Courts were built on it.

Services
In April 1910, this amounted to 29 services through Cleckheaton Central railway station, with services heading for Dewsbury (Market Place), Huddersfield and Mirfield.

Initially, five trains a day left Exchange station for the Queensbury direction and two left . These were later changed to all run from Exchange station and by 1947 when the LNER was running the former GNR services, 19 trains were heading towards Queensbury per day;  with most going to Halifax.

Under British Rail in the early 1950s, Exchange station was one of the first stations in Britain to receive services with the new DMUs which operated between Exchange and Leeds Central.

Closure
Some state that the station merely moved as it retained its name of Exchange, not becoming Bradford Interchange until a later date (which is also disputed as to when that name change occurred). Those who list the closure of the 10-platform Exchange station include Cobb, and Joy. Bairstow states that Exchange opened in May 1850, and has never closed.

The date of the name change for the 1973 station from Exchange to Interchange is listed as being in either 1983, or 1986.

Architecture
The 10-platform station, with its twin-roof shed, was noted for its architectural style, and some have stated regret over its demolition. Unlike other contemporary railway stations of their era, none of the city centre stations survive intact, save for some retaining and cutting walls. Biddle described the station as having a "..short, straight, double-arched roof, notable for its fan-like glazing bars in the gables, and delicate iron whorls and curves in the brackets." Allen Jackson labelled Exchange station as a "cathedral to railways."

The demolition of Bradford Exchange station, along with the Euston Arch, Glasgow St Enoch, and the Crumlin Viaduct, was listed by Binney and Pearce as putting "British Rail into its own category of vandal".

Chronology

Notes

References

Sources

External links

Bradford Exchange on disused stations

Railway stations in Bradford
Buildings and structures in Bradford
Transport in Bradford
Former Lancashire and Yorkshire Railway stations
Railway stations in Great Britain opened in 1850
Railway stations in Great Britain closed in 1973
1850 establishments in England